Navrongo Solar Power Station is a  solar power plant in Ghana.

Location
The power station is located near the town of Navrongo, Kassena-Nankana District in the Upper East Region of Ghana.

Overview
Built at a cost of just over US$8 million, the plant is the first grid-ready solar station in the country. It is owned by Volta River Authority (VRA), the Ghanaian parastatal responsible for public electricity generation. The power plant was commissioned in 2013.

See also

 List of power stations in Ghana
 Electricity sector in Ghana

References

External links
 Ghana: The Best Mix of Power Sources - the Way Forward for Ghana

Energy infrastructure in Ghana
Kassena-Nankana District
Solar power stations in Ghana
Upper East Region